The Transport and Logistics Centre (TALC) is a national policy and practice research centre based in Sydney, Australia. Its prime objective is the building of capability in the transport and logistics sector in Australia.

The Transport and Logistics Centre was established in 2000. It acts as a "think tank" for new ideas in capability building in T&L. It also provides advice to the T&L industry in matters of workforce planning and skills development - especially mentoring, innovation and knowledge sharing. From 2007 TALC  became a not-for-profit company limited by guarantee with the same mandate as before, but with a greater capacity to undertake flexible programmes and projects.

TALC is currently working with companies and unions and in T&L industry, and with the Commonwealth Department of Infrastructure and Transport, Infrastructure Australia, several industry associations including the state-based freight councils, AFIF, LAA, CILTA, SCLAA, ARTIO, VTA, APICS and AITPM; and with state agencies including the New South Wales RTA. TALC supports the research forum at the national SMART Conference. It also has a close working relationship in terms of research and field work with the Australian School of Business at the University of New South Wales, and the Workforce Futures Centre at Macquarie University.

Programmes
It has a range of programmes underway; the main ones are:

 Creation of two professional development accreditation programmes - Certified Transport Planner and Certified Professional Logistician
 Various awareness raising projects for schools across Australia to encourage young people to consider joining the transport and logistics industry as a career
 Research projects on request from Government - including analyses of collaborative infrastructure principles, and policy intermediation

External links
Official TALC website

Logistics
Think tanks based in Australia
2000 establishments in Australia